Server Sundaram is an unreleased Indian Tamil-language action comedy film written and directed by Anand Balki, and produced by J. Selvakumar. The film features Santhanam, Vaibhavi Shandilya and Snehan. It was filmed throughout 2016, but failed to have a theatrical release due to distribution issues.

Cast 

Santhanam as  K. Sundaram
Vaibhavi Shandilya as Sanjana
Snehan
Bijesh as Raja Pandi
Kiran Rathod
Radha Ravi
Kitty
Maya Sundarakrishnan
Mayilsamy
Shanmugarajan
Swaminathan
Venkatesh Bhat
Chef Damodharan
Poonam Shah
Priyanka Shah
Gopi Gpr
Nandagopal
Ramadoss Rammohan
Madu Karthiek
Jan Bostock

Production 
In December 2015, debutant director Anand Balki announced that he would be making a film with Santhanam in the lead role and Santhosh Narayanan as music composer. Producer Saravanan who produced Pichaikkaran with Vijay Antony consulted the 1964 film's actor Nagesh's family, before announcing that Anand Balki's film would be titled the same. Subsequently, the team also chose to cast Nagesh's grandson, Bijesh, in a supporting role of a catering college student. Major portions of the film were shot in and around SRM Institute of Science and Technology, Chennai.

For his role of a caterer, Santhanam took training at a five-star restaurant and learnt skills from the restaurant's staff. The first look poster of the film was released on 20 January 2016 coinciding with Santhanam's birthday, while the makers revealed that project would be shot in Chennai, Goa and Dubai. In June 2016, the team shot a song with YouTube dancers Poonam and Priyanka Shah in Australia, alongside the lead actors. Filming ended by late October 2016.

Soundtrack 
The soundtrack of the movie is composed by Santhosh Narayanan. The film's soundtrack consists of five songs, four of which were written by Vivek Velmurugan of 36 Vayadhinile and Jil Jung Juk fame, while the fifth song "Kannaal Modhaadhey" was written by Muthamil of Enakkul Oruvan and Vikram Vedha fame.

Release 
Server Sundaram was originally scheduled for 7 September 2017, before being rescheduled for 29 September. After further delays, it was scheduled for 6 July 2018, before being delayed again to avoid competition with Mr. Chandramouli. After being in deadlock for more than a year, it was scheduled for 31 January 2020, only to be postponed to 14 February to avoid competition with Santhanam's other film, Dagaalty, and then to 21 February. After failing to release on the scheduled date, the film has no new release date, with the director blaming the distributors for "butcher[ing] the release.

References

External links 
 

Cooking films
Films about chefs
Films about food and drink
Films scored by Santhosh Narayanan
Films shot in Chennai
Films shot in Dubai
Films shot in the Maldives
Indian action comedy films
Unreleased Tamil-language films